Åmotsdal is a valley and small village in the municipality of Seljord  in Telemark, Norway. it is the site of Åmotsdal church (Åmotsdal kyrkje) which dates 
from 1792.

References

Villages in Vestfold og Telemark